Dentsville is an unincorporated community in Charles County, Maryland, United States, marked by a convenience store dating from the turn of the 20th century, two cemeteries, and adjacent small businesses, including the Dentsville Rescue Squad and Auxiliary founded in 1998 on Maryland Route 6, east of La Plata. Dentsville was named after the Dent family, who have resided locally since colonial times. Dentsville's first appearance on a map of Maryland dates from 1886.

References

Unincorporated communities in Charles County, Maryland
Unincorporated communities in Maryland